Eternal Gosh! (often abbreviated as EG) is a Burmese pop rock band, founded in 2013. The band consists of 5 members, lead vocalist and songwriter Han Nay Tar, lead guitarists Wai Gyi and Yee Mon Oo, bassist Bon Bon and drummer Ar Ray.  Their music spans a wide range of genres, from pop rock, to alternative rock, to alternative metal.

The band attracted interest from major music labels and publishers. They were managed by i-Entertain Company and Demo Thaw, co-founder and vice-president at i-Entertain. The band's first EP, Your Surprise Is Our Heartbeats (Y.S.I.O.H) was released in 2017. Their debut full-length album, The Red Sky (Kaung Kin A Ni), was released on 5 October 2017 under Bo Bo Entertainment. The band's albums were released by Legacy Music Network. On 31 August, Eternal Gosh! performed at the FG LIVE LOUNGE Concert at Yay Kuu Amplified Broadcast Station.

History

Background and origins 
The name Eternal Gosh!, according to founding member Han Nay Tar, came from a book. Eternal Gosh! was initially formed on 23 May 2013 by Han Nay Tar, Wai Gyi and Ar Ray. Han Nay Tar and Wai Gyi are originally from Magway. They came to Yangon to make music and met Ar Ray at a guitar class. Later Yee Mon Oo was invited to fill in as their guitarist and was the last to join the band.

Music history 
The band's debut EP, Your Surprise Is Our Heartbeats (Y.S.I.O.H.), was released in 2017, independently through online distribution. Their first studio album, The Red Sky (Kaung Kin A Ni), was released on 5 October 2017. After releasing The Red Sky, the song Moe Ma Kha Eain Mat Kha Yan Pyar was the longest charting No 1 on the Myanmar Top Chart on JOOX. On 30 November 2018, Eternal Gosh! performed at 369 Dine and Bar, ibis Style Yangon Stadium Hotel with Idiots Band.

On 15 March 2019, the official music video of Moe Ma Kha Eain Mat Kayan Pyar was released. The band also released their second official music video of Sea Ghost on 1 June 2019. They released the soundtrack of the TV series Seven Cash in collaboration with Taurus V Production on 1 July 2019.
On 24 March, Eternal Gosh! performed at the Myanmar Yout Shi Concert at the Hard Rock Cafe in Myanmar Plaza with Idiots Band in Yangon. They also performed at the FG Live Lounge at Yay Kuu Amplified Broadcast Center together with Idiots Band on 31 August. On 25 October, the band performed at the MYANFEST festival organized by Myanmar Beer with other famous singers at Thuwanabumi Event Park in Yangon.

On 11 November 2019, Eternal Gosh! performed at the "Say Paung Kha Tae Yangon Nya" (Full Moon Day) Rock Music Concert together with Zaw Win Htut (Emperor Band) at Thuwunnabumi Event Park in Yangon.

On 1 February 2020, Eternal Gosh won the "2019 Most Popular New Artist Award" from the City FM 18th Anniversary Music Awards, one of the two major music awards in Myanmar.

Band members 
 Current
Han Nay Tar—vocals (2013–present)
Wai Gyi—guitar (2013–present)                                                                                              
Ar Ray—drums (2013–present)
Yee Mon Oo—guitar (2018–present)
Bon Bon—bass (2018—present)

Past
 Moe Wai—bass (2013–2018)

Discography

Extended plays 
Your Surprise Is Our Heartbeats (Y.S.I.O.H.)

Studio albums 
The Red Sky (Kaung Kin A Ni) (2017)

Singles

Music videos 

| 2020
| "Chay Htauk" "Leg"
| Non-album single
|}

Awards and nominations

References

External links 
 
 

Burmese musical groups